Heikki Aho may refer to:
 Heikki Aho (footballer) (born 1983), Finnish footballer
 Heikki Aho (filmmaker) (1895–1961), Finnish filmmaker